Israel participated in the Eurovision Song Contest 2001 in Copenhagen. Tal Sondak represented Israel with the song "En Davar".

Before Eurovision

Kdam Eurovision 2001 
The final took place on 28 December 2000 at the Neve Ilan TV Studios in Jerusalem, hosted by Duo Datz and broadcast on Channel 1. Twelve entries competed and the winner was selected by a combination of the votes from five voting groups: three regional juries jury groups (18%), an expert jury of IBA representatives (29%) and votes from the public (53%).

The winner was "En Davar" performed by Tal Sondak, and written by Yair Klinger and Shimrit Orr. The song is a ballad, and the song's title means "Never Mind" with lyrics aimed to the singer's lover, telling her that whatever is troubling her should not be dwelled upon, rather she should let the words of his song wash away her troubles.

At Eurovision 
"En Davar" was performed fifth on the night, following Norway and preceding Russia. At the close of voting, it had received 25 points, placing 16th in a field of 23.

Voting

References

2001
Countries in the Eurovision Song Contest 2001
Eurovision